Étroubles is a town and comune in the Aosta Valley region of northwestern Italy.

Sights include a bell tower from a now disappeared 15th century Romanesque church and a medieval watchtower (built in the 12th century on a Roman foundation).

History
In Roman times, it was known as Restapolis and was the main center in the Grand-Saint-Bernard Valley. It perhaps housed the local garrison watching the main access from Gaul. In medieval times, it was a stage on the Via Francigena.

Napoleon Bonaparte stayed at Étroubles on 20 May 1800, during his march to Marengo and the eponymous battle.

Cities and towns in Aosta Valley